Isabella Fernández de Cueto (born 2003), known as Isabella Fernández, is an American-born Dominican footballer who plays as a midfielder for high school team American Heritage Patriots, the Sunrise Prime FC under–18 team and the Dominican Republic women's national team.

High school career
Fernández has attended the American Heritage School in Plantation, Florida.

International career
Fernández made her senior debut for the Dominican Republic on 21 February 2021 as an 87th-minute substitution during a 0–2 friendly home loss to Puerto Rico.

References

External links

2003 births
Living people
Citizens of the Dominican Republic through descent
Dominican Republic women's footballers
Women's association football midfielders
Dominican Republic women's international footballers
American women's soccer players
American sportspeople of Dominican Republic descent
21st-century American women